Canadian Tour 1983 is the third studio album of Sofia Rotaru, recorded in Ukraine. The album was released in 1983 in Canada and United States with 12 tracks (two side vinyl).

Track listing

Side A

Side B

Languages of performance 
Songs are performed in Ukrainian language.

See also 
 Visit to Ukraine
 Deine Zärtlichkeit

1983 albums
Sofia Rotaru albums